The , also known as the  is a Japanese Grade 1 flat horse race for three-year-old thoroughbred fillies run over a distance of 2,400 metres (approximately 1 mile 4 furlongs) at the Tokyo Racecourse, Fuchū, Tokyo in May.

History
It was first run in 1938 and is the Japanese equivalent of the English Epsom Oaks.

On May 23, 2010, in the 71st running of the Yushun Himba, Apapane and Saint Emilion hit the finish at the same time in the race, making the first time that a Grade 1 race in Japan has resulted in a dead heat for the win.

On May 20, 2018, Almond Eye won the 2,400-meter Yushun Himba over Lily Noble by two lengths.

Winners since 1990

Earlier winners

 1938 - Asteri Mor
 1939 - Hoshi Homare
 1940 - Rounella
 1941 - Tetsu Banzai
 1942 - Rock States
 1943 - Kurifuji
 1944 - no race
 1945 - no race
 1946 - Mitsumasa
 1947 - Tokitsukaze
 1948 - Yashima Hime
 1949 - King Night
 1950 - Koma Minoru
 1951 - Kiyo Fuji
 1952 - Swee Sue
 1953 - Jitsu Homare
 1954 - Yamaichi
 1955 - Hiroichi
 1956 - Fair Manna
 1957 - Miss Onward
 1958 - Miss Marusa
 1959 - Okan
 1960 - Star Roch
 1961 - Chitose Hope
 1962 - O Hayabusa
 1963 - I.T.O.
 1964 - Kane Keyaki
 1965 - Bellona
 1966 - Hiro Yoshi
 1967 - Yama Pit
 1968 - Lupinus
 1969 - Shadai Tarquin
 1970 - Jupique
 1971 - Kane Himuro
 1972 - Take Fubuki
 1973 - Nasuno Chigusa
 1974 - Toko Elsa
 1975 - Tesco Gaby
 1976 - Titania
 1977 - Linear Queen
 1978 - Five Hope
 1979 - Agnes Lady
 1980 - Kei Kiroku
 1981 - Temmon
 1982 - Shadai Ivor
 1983 - Dyna Carle
 1984 - Tokai Roman
 1985 - Noah no Hakobune
 1986 - Mejiro Ramonu
 1987 - Max Beauty
 1988 - Cosmo Dream
 1989 - Light Color

See also
 Horse racing in Japan
 List of Japanese flat horse races

References
Racing Post: 

Horse races in Japan
Turf races in Japan
Flat horse races for three-year-old fillies